The University of Alabama Press is a university press founded in 1945 and is the scholarly publishing arm of the University of Alabama. An editorial board composed of representatives from all doctoral degree granting public universities within Alabama oversees the publishing program. Projects are selected that support, extend, and preserve academic research. The Press also publishes books that foster an understanding of the history and culture of this state and region. The Press strives to publish works in a wide variety of formats such as print, electronic, and on-demand technologies to ensure that the works are widely available.

As the only academic publisher for the state of Alabama, The University of Alabama Press has in the past undertaken publishing partnerships with such institutions as the Birmingham Museum of Art and Samford University, and The College of Agriculture, the Jule Collins Smith Museum of Fine Art, and the Pebble Hill Center for the Humanities at Auburn University. It serves as the publisher of the Fiction Collective Two (FC2) imprint for experimental fiction.

History

The University of Alabama Press was founded in the fall of 1945 with James Benjamin McMillan as founding director. The Press's first work was Roscoe C. Martin's New Horizons in Public Administration, which appeared in February 1946. In 1964, the Press joined the organization now known as the Association of University Presses.

The Press has won numerous awards for its publications over the years and has developed a solid list of titles in archaeology, public administration, and several areas of literature and history. With a staff of 17, the Press publishes between 60 and 65 new books a year and has a backlist of approximately 1,350 titles.

It was awarded the General Basil W. Duke Award from the Military Order of the Stars and Bars for its re-publication of Marcus B. Toney's Civil War memoir, The Privations of a Private, in 2006.

See also

 List of English-language book publishing companies
 List of university presses

References

External links
 

Press
Alabama
Publishing companies established in 1945
Alabama literature